Hugo Strange is a supervillain appearing in comic books published by DC Comics, commonly as an adversary of the superhero Batman. The character is one of Batman's first recurring villains and is also one of the first to discover his secret identity. The character first appeared in Detective Comics #36 (February 1940).

A notorious enemy of Batman, the character has appeared in various forms of non-comics media, including animation, video games, and the live-action television series Gotham, where he is portrayed by BD Wong.

Fictional character biography

Pre-Crisis

Earth-One
Professor Hugo Strange first appears in Detective Comics #36 (February 1940) as a scientist and criminal mastermind who uses a stolen "concentrated lightning" machine to generate a dense fog every night so his gang can rob banks unseen, though he knows that Batman poses a threat to him. Batman, who already knows of Strange's experiments, begins investigating him after one of his henchmen commits a murder. When the robbers are apprehended, Strange vows to set a trap for Batman and deal with him personally. He has a dozen of his men ambush the vigilante, and one of them knocks him out with a blackjack. Batman wakes up in Strange's lair, where Strange hangs him from his wrists and lashes him with a whip. Batman breaks the ropes, gases the room, and defeats Strange, who is jailed but quickly begins planning his escape. In Batman #1 (spring 1940), he carries out his escape plan, recruits a new gang of criminals, then breaks out "five insane patients" from the local asylum and uses them as test subjects, turning them into hulking 15 ft. tall monsters by administering a powerful artificial growth hormone that acts on the pituitary gland. He outfits them with bulletproof clothing, and uses them to rampage through Gotham City and distract the police while his men commit robberies. Strange administers the serum to Batman after the giants capture him, saying it will work in 18 hours. Batman tricks two of the monsters into killing each other, and then formulates a drug that prevents any abnormal secretions from the pituitary gland, preventing the transformation. He is then able to kill all the other monsters, and sends Strange to his apparent death in a fall from a cliff, although he suspects that the mad scientist has survived. In Detective Comics #46 (December 1940), Strange returns and starts spreading a fear-inducing powder around the city until a punch from Batman again sends him falling off a cliff to his apparent death.

He returned years later in the 1970s in the "Strange Apparitions" story arc in Detective Comics #469-479 (May 1977-September–October 1978). Having survived his earlier "death" (how this happened is never explained, seen or shown), Strange left Gotham City and went to Europe for several years, where his criminal career prospered with no one to challenge him. Bored and hoping to pit his wits against Batman again, Strange, now using the alias of Dr. Todhunter, opens a private hospital, Graytowers Clinic, for Gotham's wealthiest citizens, where he holds them for ransom before mutating them into mindless monsters. When Bruce Wayne checks into the hospital to recover discreetly from radiation burns he sustained while fighting Doctor Phosphorus, Strange finds out that Wayne is Batman and uses this information to wreak havoc on his personal life. Strange then attempts to auction off the identity of Batman to Gotham City Councilman "Boss" Rupert Thorne, the Penguin, and the Joker. Not wanting to lose, Thorne has Strange abducted and beaten by his men to reveal Batman's identity, but Strange apparently dies without ever telling him. Strange's ghost then comes back to haunt Thorne, driving the Councilman insane. Thorne confesses his long career of corruption and is sent to Arkham Asylum.

Strange's ghost returns again to haunt Thorne in Detective Comics #513 (April 1982), #516 (July 1982), #518 (September 1982), and #520 (November 1982) and Batman #354 (December 1982), leading up to the appearance of the real Hugo Strange in the last panel of the last page of the fifth issue mentioned here. As revealed two issues later in Batman #356 (February 1983), Strange had indeed survived the beating from Thorne's men by using yoga techniques to slow his heartbeat to an undetectable level. It is also revealed that Strange also artificially created the "ghost" of himself that haunted Thorne by using strategically-placed devices that simulated the appearance of a spirit. Upon his return, Strange used the devices again to bring back the "ghost" so he could punish Thorne for double-crossing him. Subsequently, Strange attempts to weaken Bruce Wayne through the use of drugs and lifelike robots called Mandroids, with the ultimate goal of destroying Wayne so completely that Strange could take his place as Batman. The plan fails, and Strange apparently dies once more when he attempts to kill Batman by blowing up a replica of Wayne Manor with himself in it, stating that if he cannot be Batman, then no one can. Batman survives the explosion, but no trace of Strange is found.

Later, Strange returns yet again (the Hugo Strange that "died" in the explosion was revealed by the real Strange to be a Mandroid) in Batman Annual #10 (1986), in another attempt to destroy Batman and Bruce Wayne, this time attempting to financially bankrupt Wayne by using various tricks to force three Wayne Enterprises shareholders to sell their stock holdings to him so he could bankrupt the company. He also attempts to frame Batman as a criminal. However, Strange is defeated and sent to prison. Batman is able to stop Strange from further exploiting his knowledge of his secret identity by falsely claiming that he hypnotized Strange to give him a fake idea of Batman's true identity just before Commissioner Gordon shows up to arrest him; his explanation is so convincing that Strange begins to wonder if Batman is attempting a complex double-bluff by letting him think that Bruce Wayne is Batman and thus doubts whether his original conclusion was correct.

Earth-Two
The Earth-Two version of Strange has a similar early history to the Earth-One version and also survives the fall that he experienced in Detective Comics #46. In The Brave and the Bold #182 (January 1982), it is revealed that he is left paralyzed by the fall but, after years of physical therapy, he regains enough movement to write out the surgical techniques needed to repair the damage to his body - and bribes a surgeon to perform the operation. The surgeon lacks Strange's skill, and the operation leaves Strange physically deformed (the surgeon is then killed for his failure). Strange uses one of his devices to capture Starman's Cosmic Rod to use its power to attack everyone and everything that Batman holds dear. He generates a storm in Gotham to obtain the device, which creates a dimensional doorway to Earth-One, bringing that universe's Batman over to Earth-Two, which allows him and Earth-Two's Robin to join with Earth-Two's Batwoman in defeating Strange. Strange realizes that he is, in fact, angry at his own wasted life and deformed body, so he uses the Cosmic Rod to commit suicide.

Post-Crisis
In the Post-Crisis continuity, Strange was reintroduced in the "Prey" storyline as an eccentric private psychiatrist enlisted to help a task force assigned to capture Batman by providing them with a psychological profile of the vigilante. While brilliant at his work, Strange is depicted as being equally unbalanced: he becomes so obsessed with the case, he starts wearing a replica Batman costume in private, convinced that he alone understands the darkness that drives Batman.

According to Commissioner Gordon, Strange was "abandoned as a child, grew up in state homes. A bright kid, but he apparently had a hell of a temper. Nobody knows how he put himself through college and medical school." Strange was raised in an orphanage on the lower East Side of Gotham City, in a neighborhood known as "Hell's Crucible". As an adult, he became a professor of psychiatry at Gotham State University, but had his tenure suspended after using his position to promote a series of increasingly bizarre genetic engineering theories. He is approached by an Indian man named Sanjay, who seeks Strange's aid in curing his sick brother. Strange agrees to help, and Sanjay works loyally by his side from that point onward. Borrowing money from gangster Sal Maroni, who is in the employ of Gotham kingpin Carmine Falcone, Strange sets up a private laboratory to test his theories. He then bribes a corrupt orderly to supply him with ideal test subjects: incurably insane inmates from Arkham Asylum who have been institutionalized for so long that they will not be missed.

Strange's experiments have literally monstrous results, with his test subjects turning into gigantic, mindless "Monster Men", possessing superhuman strength and cannibalistic instincts. Strange uses the Monster Men to commit crimes so he can put together the money needed to pay back his Mafia connections. Batman becomes involved after discovering some of the gruesome remains of the Monster's Men's cannibalistic rampages. When Strange sets his creations free at an illegal poker game, helping himself to the victims' money after the slaughter, the Gotham Mafia begins to grow suspicious. Batman tracks Strange down, but is captured by Sanjay and thrown to the Monster Men as an intended meal. Batman not only holds off the creatures, but uses them as part of an inventive escape. Strange is enthralled by Batman, believing that he has found a genetically perfect man. He creates one final Monster Man using a drop of Batman's blood, and while his creation still has many of the flaws of its "brothers", it lacks most of the grotesque disfigurements that had plagued Strange's earlier creations. Strange is subsequently forced to destroy his lab to evade capture. Soon after, he turns the Monster Men loose, including Sanjay's brother (who had also been mutated as a result of Strange's "treatments"), at Falcone's private estate in a bid to wipe out the Mob's leaders, erasing his debt and covering up their ties to his work. In the battle that follows, all of the Monster Men are killed, along with Sanjay (who abandons Strange and dies trying to avenge his brother). Strange escapes amid the chaos, and succeeds in eradicating all links between himself and his experiments. Confident that his criminal past is permanently buried, he begins to appear on TV by reinventing himself as a "psychological expert" on Batman.

It is possible that the events of Doug Moench and Paul Gulacy's "Prey" storyline take place at this point. Partly due to Strange's appearances on TV claiming to understand Batman's motives, Captain James Gordon is ordered to assemble a task force to apprehend the vigilante, with Strange assisting him as a consultant to deduce Batman's secret identity. As the task force's investigation progresses, Strange grows increasingly maniacal in his obsession with Batman, going so far as expressing a desire to become Batman and dressing up in a replica Batsuit. To that end, Strange attempts to kill the Caped Crusader. However, Strange repeatedly underestimates the level of physical conditioning that is needed to be Batman (e.g., incorrectly theorizing that Batman has only been active for the past five years while Gordon correctly deduces that it would take a lifetime of training to achieve Batman's abilities). Strange also diagnoses Batman with various mental illnesses, such as explaining Batman's use of a costume as symptomatic of a multiple personality disorder, whereas Gordon more accurately explains the Batsuit's intended purpose as "scaring the pants off criminals". Strange eventually concludes that Bruce Wayne is most likely Batman, brainwashes the task force's commander to impersonate Batman to turn the public against him and sends him to kidnap the Mayor's daughter while dressed as the Dark Knight. Despite Strange's attempt to psychologically "break" Batman by creating recordings and setting up mannequins of Thomas and Martha Wayne blaming Bruce for their deaths, even using Wayne Manor itself to enhance his illusions, Bruce is able to collect himself and focus in the Batcave. The following day, he confronts Strange and tricks the professor into doubting his own hypothesis about Batman's secret identity, claiming that his parents are alive and living in Paraguay. Strange is ultimately exposed, and is shot twice by the task force when he attempts to escape dressed in his replica Batsuit before falling into a river and disappearing. Strange is then presumed dead.

In Doug Moench's "Terror" storyline, Strange mysteriously returns. He decides to work with another of Batman's enemies, the Scarecrow, and use him as a tool to help him capture Batman, while simultaneously having fallen into a further delusional state, as he engages in a "relationship" with a female mannequin dressed in Batman's cowl, reflecting his warped dual admiration and loathing of Batman. The Scarecrow turns on Strange when the professor's therapy proves effective enough to turn the Scarecrow against his "benefactor", tricking Strange into falling into the cellar of his mansion base where the twisted psychiatrist is impaled on a weather vane that the Scarecrow had left in the cellar earlier. The Scarecrow then uses Strange's mansion as a trap for Batman, but his attempt to use Strange's plan fails when he tries to use Crime Alley as the scene of a trap while ignorant of the reasons why that alley is so significant to Batman, with his "trap" merely consisting of luring Batman into the alley and decapitating a former classmate of Crane's in front of the hero. With Catwoman's help, Batman locates the Scarecrow's hideout and catches the Scarecrow in the cellar with Strange's body before the house is destroyed in a fire, but loses sight of Strange, with it being unclear whether Strange had actually survived the fall onto the weather vanehe claimed that he lured rats to himself by using his sweat so that he could eat themor if the Scarecrow and Batman were hallucinating from exposure to Crane's new fear gas, although Batman concludes that the subsequent explosion of the house has definitely killed Strange.

Dark Moon Rising: Batman and the Monster Men, "Prey" and "Terror" all take place during Batman's early years. In the modern timeline, Strange returns in a four-part storyline called "Transference". Initially appearing in his own Batsuit, he captures Catwoman with the aid of his henchwoman Doraa former patient whom he has subjected to extensive mental conditioning by Strange to act as a new "Catwoman"and attempts to interrogate her about Batman's current status, Strange dismissing the existence of Batman's new allies by proclaiming them to be "parasites", as he cannot accept that Batman would share his "power" with anyone. He is then shown posing as a psychiatrist doing standard stress evaluations at Wayne Enterprises. While Bruce Wayne is on the couch, Strange drugs him with a powerful hallucinogen to coax Wayne into admitting that he is Batman. Wayne is able to escape by using cleaning fluid to start a fire, fakes Batman's death by destroying the Batmobile with him supposedly in it, and triggers a post-hypnotic suggestion in himself, forcing him to completely repress the Batman aspect of his mind until Robin and Nightwing can defeat Strange. Faced with Nightwing and Robin each denying that Wayne is Batman and witnessing Wayne's complete lack of combat reflexes and training, Strange becomes concerned that his theory that Bruce Wayne is Batman has been disproved and realizes that he will never be able to learn the truth now that he "killed" the Dark Knight. Faced with this conflicting situation, Strange has a mental breakdown and voluntarily turns himself in at Arkham Asylum.

Strange next reappears as the head of a gang of supervillains attempting to take control of Gotham's East Side, then controlled by Catwoman. Catwoman joins Strange's gang, then allows its members to "find out" that she intends to betray them, faking her death when they attempt to eliminate her. Although she defeats and imprisons most of the gang, and even convinces Strange to leave the East Side alone, Strange still mocks her by pointing out that he had faked his own death far more often than she had.

In Batman #665, Batman tells Tim Drake that a huge man dressed like a combination of Bane and Batman had beaten him up and he suspects that the impostor had used "Hugo Strange's monster serum and daily Venom shots" to gain his size and strength.

In the story arc Gotham Underground, Strange is associating with other supervillains such as the Mad Hatter, Doctor Death and Two-Face. Strange and the others are rounded up by the Suicide Squad.

Strange takes part in the miniseries Salvation Run. He is among the supervillains imprisoned on another planet.

Strange also appears in The Batman Adventures, which is set in the DC Animated Universe. Issues #35-36 of the comic book provide him with a tragic backstory: he witnessed the murder of his son David by Mob boss Rupert Thorne and was so overcome with grief that he sought to literally erase the memory with his mind control technology. The plan backfired, however; following the experiment, he could remember nothing but his son's death. After Batman stops him from killing Thorne, Strange is imprisoned in Arkham Asylum.

The New 52
In the continuity of The New 52, the 2011 reboot of the DC Universe, Detective Comics (vol. 2) introduces the reader to Hugo Strange's son, Eli Strange, for the first time. Eli is first seen playing a game of poker with members of the Russian Mob, betting a valuable bracelet, winning big and cleaning house. Before he can walk away with his winnings, one of the mobsters forces him to play another hand, then discovers Eli's sleeve is loaded with cards. Before he can have him killed, the criminals realize that their bracelet (Eli's was a fake replica) had been stolen. Catwoman then pounces from the ceiling and takes out the entire group. She thanks Eli for being her distraction (the two having been working together the entire time) and tells him to run home to his father, which he is last seen doing.

Later, Strange tasks his son with overseeing an operation to dose Gotham with fear gas. The Scarecrow led Batman to believe that a small boy in a picture would be harmed unless he put a stop to it. Arriving at the scene, Batman realizes that the small boy was actually Eli. He manages to avert the disaster and Eli is arrested. Later, Batman reveals that "Eli Strange" is actually an alias and that the boy's real name is Elliot Montrose.

During the Forever Evil storyline, Hugo Strange is among the supervillains recruited by the Crime Syndicate to join the Secret Society of Super Villains.

DC Rebirth
In the continuity of DC Rebirth, DC Comics' 2016 relaunch of its monthly superhero books, Hugo Strange appears during the "Night of the Monster Men" crossover story line. Although apparently now ignorant of Batman's identity, he is now determined to prove his superiority by attacking Gotham with a group of "Monster Men" created from the corpses of his former patients as representations of what Strange perceives as Batman's greatest flaws - his ego, grief, and fear - which ultimately provokes Batman into a confrontation at Strange's office penthouse headquarters. Strange wears what he terms a "suicide suit" - a near-replica of the Batsuit without the cape and cowl that is rigged to detonate if its wearer is subjected to any physical attack - on the assumption that Batman will have no choice but to surrender the cowl to him as the "true" Batman since he cannot take a life. Nightwing is able to defeat the final monster - an amalgamation of the previous ones - by literally leaping inside it to inject it with a prepared antidote, while Batman outwits Strange by having his ally Clayface cover the penthouse in an airtight seal prior to the confrontation. Strange, delirious and running out of oxygen, loses consciousness while Batman is still standing, Nightwing musing that Strange failed to realize that Batman's flaws were actually his motivation in protecting Gotham.

Hugo Strange later appears as a member of the Cabal alongside Doctor Psycho, Per Degaton, the Queen Bee I, and Amazo.

Other versions

Batman '66
In the Batman '66 universe, Hugo Strange is initially a psychiatrist at the Arkham Institute, until being revealed as a villain in Batman '66 Meets the Man from U.N.C.L.E..

DC Comics Bombshells
In the DC Comics Bombshells universe, Hugo Strange is a eugenicist attempting to improve the gene pool. He weeds out what he considers unclean.

Following Killer Frost's plan to create a race of superhumans, Strange allied himself with the Penguin and Harvey Dent. With Harvey Dent at the head of Gotham City, Strange would have had access to all Gothamites' genes and control the generations to come. When the Batgirls attempted to stop the Penguin and his allies, Hugo Strange used his modified gun to force the Batgirls to fight each other. However, Dent eventually betrayed the Penguin and him in favor of the Batgirls. Strange fled in response, promising to find other scientists who share his dream. Strange found new allies within the Soviets. They fund his researches and he created several clones using Supergirl's DNA, of which two of them are Power Girl, who became the Soviet Union's secret weapon, and Superman, who he considered a failure.

One year later, Strange captured Supergirl and Steve Trevor. With Supergirl as a guinea pig, Strange intended to create a perfect army to purge the world. During the tests, Supergirl was able to turn Power Girl against Strange, and the Reaper and Lois Lane, who had found the laboratory thanks to Killer Frost, blew up the laboratory's security system. Strange attempted to stop the Reaper, Lois Lane, Steve Trevor, Power Girl and Supergirl using his remaining clones. However, they were able to leave the place without a fight, taking Superman with them.

In other media

Television

Live action

Hugo Strange makes his live-action debut in season two of Gotham, portrayed by BD Wong. He is depicted as the corrupt and manipulative Chief of Psychiatry at Arkham Asylum and overseer of Indian Hill, a secret division of Wayne Enterprises that  experiments on metahumans. His chief project is resurrecting the dead, an endeavor funded by a mysterious council known as the Court of Owls, and which he initiates with Theo Galavan, whom he revives as the warrior Azrael. A friend and colleague of Bruce Wayne's father Thomas, it is revealed that he played a role in the murder of Wayne and his wife Martha by hiring Patrick Malone to kill them. 

After being investigated by Jim Gordon and the GCPD, he is arrested for numerous crimes. Strange is later placed in federal custody, only to be kidnapped by one of his resurrected experiments, gangster Fish Mooney. Strange cures Mooney of her terminal illness in exchange for his freedom. He is then recruited once more to work for the Court of Owls improving a dispersal method for a virus that would turn people into homicidal maniacs. After giving the dispersal device to the Sensei, Strange tries to escape Gotham before the detonation. 

Strange becomes the target of a gang war between the League of Assassins, Mooney, the Riddler, and the GCPD because he is the only one who knows how to cure the virus. He ultimately chooses to work with the GCPD in exchange for a pardon for his earlier crimes, and develops the cure. 

Following his pardon, Strange goes into hiding until Oswald Cobblepot recruits him to cure his minion Butch Gilzean of the illness that has turned him into the zombie-like Solomon Grundy and resurrect the Riddler and Leslie Thompkins following their deaths. Strange succeeds doing all three, only to betray Cobblepot by switching allegiances to the League of Assassins. 

Under the orders of Nyssa al Ghul, he turns the Riddler and Thompkins into sleeper agents with a microchip that can be controlled remotely. After the Riddler discovers his microchip, he confronts Strange and orders it removed. Gordon and Eduardo Dorrance interrupt the operation and discover what Strange has done. Before he can be arrested, Dorrance reveals to Gordon that he is loyal to Nyssa. Strange escapes after the Riddler is remotely ordered by Dorrance to kill Gordon. After Dorrance is critically injured by Gordon, Nyssa asks Strange to save Dorrance's life. Strange does so by injecting him with a serum known as Venom, but the process turns his patient into a mutant named Bane. Strange later implants a mind control microchip into U.S. Army General Wade, who is now controlled by Nyssa. After attempting to turn Gordon into another Bane-like creature, Strange is defeated once again, but disappears before he can be arrested.

Animation

 Hugo Strange appears in the DC Animated Universe:
 Hugo Strange appears in the Batman: The Animated Series episode "The Strange Secret of Bruce Wayne", voiced by Ray Buktenica. This version is a psychiatrist that runs a rest hospital that he uses to blackmail Gotham City's elite with secrets via a machine that reads minds.
 Hugo Strange makes a non-speaking cameo appearance in the Justice League Unlimited episode "The Doomsday Sanction", as part of Project Cadmus, replacing Doctor Moon. According to Dwayne McDuffie, Strange was meant to appear in "Question Authority", but was instead replaced by Moon due to the Bat-embargo rendering him unavailable for use.
 Hugo Strange appears in The Batman, voiced by Frank Gorshin and later by Richard Green. This version is the chief psychologist at Arkham Asylum, running experiments on its inmates until being sentenced there in "Gotham's Ultimate Criminal Mastermind" after unleashing an advanced robot named D.A.V.E. based on Gotham's criminals.
 Hugo Strange makes a non-speaking appearance in the Batman: The Brave and the Bold episode "The Knights of Tomorrow!". Strange appears with his Monster Men and is defeated by Batman and Catwoman.
 Hugo Strange appears in the series Young Justice, voiced by Adrian Pasdar. Introduced in the episode "Terrors", Strange is the psychiatrist of Belle Reve, working under warden Amanda Waller and later an agent of the Light. 
 Hugo Strange appears in the short film Batman: Strange Days, voiced by Brian George. Strange has one of his Monster Men kidnap a woman to use her blood for an experiment, but Batman fires tear gas at them. Strange takes the woman hostage, but falls off a cliff when he backs away from Batman unto unstable ground.

Film
 Hugo Strange appears in The Lego Batman Movie. He is one of several villains allied with the Joker.
 Hugo Strange appears in Batman vs. Two-Face, voiced by Jim Ward. This version is a Gotham State Penitentiary doctor using an "Evil Extractor" on Gotham's supervillains, which he claims will purify them of corruption.
 Hugo Strange appears in Batman: Gotham by Gaslight, voiced by William Salyers. This version is the director of Arkham Asylum and is fascinated by the concepts of masks and alternate identities, which draws him to both Batman and Jack the Ripper. He is later killed after Jack throws him into a pit filled with Strange’s patients, who proceed to tear him in half.

Video games

Batman: Arkham

 Hugo Strange's character bio is unlockable in Batman: Arkham Asylum by scanning his psychiatric files of Arkham's inmates in the Library.
 Hugo Strange appears in Batman: Arkham City, voiced by Corey Burton, as the warden of the titular super-prison and a secret disciple of Ra's al Ghul. In the game's story, Strange and his accomplice Mayor Quincy Sharp hire the mercenary group TYGER to act as the security detail of Arkham City, while planning a purge on all criminals within it called "Protocol Ten". According to Rocksteady Studios, this is the first time that Batman has faced him in this continuity.

Other games
 Hugo Strange is a featured villain and playable character in the mini-game "Villain Hunt" on the Nintendo DS version of Lego Batman: The Video Game.
 Hugo Strange appears as a summonable character in Scribblenauts Unmasked: A DC Comics Adventure.
 Hugo Strange makes a cameo appearance in Injustice: Gods Among Us. He appears as a doctor present at Arkham Asylum, observing the fight and presumably taking notes.
 Hugo Strange appears as a playable character in Lego DC Super-Villains, voiced by Corey Burton reprising his role from Batman: Arkham City.

Podcast 
 In Batman Unburied, Hugo Strange is Cornelius Stirk's psychiatrist and is portrayed by John Rhys-Davies.

See also
List of Batman family enemies
Doctor Strange (Marvel)

References

Batman characters
Characters created by Bill Finger
Characters created by Bob Kane
Comics characters introduced in 1940
DC Comics male supervillains
DC Comics orphans
DC Comics scientists
Fictional American psychiatrists
Fictional characters who have made pacts with devils
Fictional characters with schizophrenia
Fictional geneticists
Fictional mad scientists
Fictional mass murderers
Fictional torturers
Golden Age supervillains
Fictional necromancers